The Remembrance Driveway in Australia is a road and memorial system of arboreal parks, plantations, and road-side rest areas that provide a living memorial in honour of those who served in the Australian Defence Forces in World War II, the Korean War, Malayan Emergency and the Vietnam War, and who continue to serve around the world. The most prominent feature of the driveway are a series of rest areas dedicated in honour of the Australian Victoria Cross recipients from World War II onwards.

Route
The northeastern terminus of the Remembrance Driveway is in Macquarie Place, Sydney, and follows the  Hume Highway, Hume Motorway, a small section of the Old Hume Highway, and Federal Highway between Sydney, the state capital of New South Wales, and Canberra, the national capital, where its southwestern terminus is at Remembrance Park, adjacent to the Australian War Memorial.

The Remembrance Driveway was instituted in 1954 when Queen Elizabeth II and the Duke of Edinburgh marked the beginning of the Driveway by planting two plane trees in Macquarie Place.

Rest areas
The Victoria Cross rest areas and memorial parks sited along the Driveway honour the 24 Australian World War II and Vietnam War Victoria Cross winners.

See also

Military history of Australia

References

External links

Remembrance Driveway web site with maps
VC Citations

Australian military memorials
Tourist attractions in New South Wales
Tourist attractions in Canberra
1954 establishments in Australia
Roads in New South Wales
Roads in the Australian Capital Territory
Military memorials in Canberra
Military memorials in New South Wales
Rest areas in Australia